The gender star is a nonstandard typographic style used by some authors in gender-neutral language in German. It is formed by placing an asterisk after the stem and appending the feminine plural suffix "-innen". For example,  ([male] driver, singular & plural) becomes  (drivers). The gender star makes it possible to refer to all genders while also including non-binary people. 

Alternatives to the gender star include  (with medial capital I), the gender gap (where an underscore takes the place of the asterisk) or using inherently gender neutral terms, such as 'people' instead of 'man' or 'woman'. The gender star was named the German Anglicism of the Year in 2018 by the Leibniz-Institut für Deutsche Sprache.

Pronunciation
In speech, the gender star is sometimes signaled by a glottal stop.

Usage
The use of the gender star can be traced back to 2013. It has been used by the Berlin Senate since 2017, and the German Green Party since 2015.

Response
In 2019, the German Language Association VDS (Verein Deutsche Sprache; not to be confused with the Association for the German Language Gesellschaft für deutsche Sprache, GfdS) launched a petition against the use of the gender star, saying it was a "destructive intrusion" into the German language and created "ridiculous linguistic structures". It was signed by over 100 writers and scholars. Luise F. Pusch, a German feminist linguist, criticises the gender star as it still makes women the 'second choice' by the use of the feminine suffix. In 2020, the German Language Association (Verein Deutsche Sprache, VDS) declared Gendersternchen to be one of the 10 German Words of the Year.

See also 

 Feminist language reform
 Gender-neutral pronoun
 Gender neutrality in languages with grammatical gender
 Gender role in language
 German orthography
 German nouns
 Grammatical gender in German
 Language and gender
 Language and thought
 Lavender linguistics
 Sapir-Whorf hypothesis
 Women's studies

References

Typography
Gender-neutral language